Red Ronin is a fictional gigantic humanoid robotic construct (mecha) appearing in American comic books published by Marvel Comics, and went on to be a menace to other Marvel characters such as the Avengers and Wolverine.

Publication history
Originally created by writer Doug Moench and artist Herb Trimpe as a foil for Godzilla, Red Ronin's design was influenced by those of the super robots that were the staple of anime during the 1970s. Super robots first came into the notice of American pop culture in the form of the Gigantor (Tetsujin Nijuhachi-28) anime series that was imported into the United States from Japan during the 1960s. Mattel's line of imported Shogun Warriors toys became popular in the United States during the late 1970s, the same time period that Red Ronin first appeared in Marvel Comics. Indeed, (then) Marvel Editor-In-Chief Archie Goodwin admitted that Red Ronin's basic design was inspired by the super robots of anime.

Fictional character biography

Original model
Red Ronin (originally referred to as SJ3RX) was developed with the assistance of Stark International by scientist Tamara Hashioka and engineer Yuriko Takiguchi, and constructed in Detroit, Michigan. It was intended to be used by S.H.I.E.L.D. as a combat instrument against the monster Godzilla. Before it could be utilized for this purpose, the robot was stolen by Robert "Rob" Takiguchi (Yuriko's 12-year-old grandson) and renamed "Red Ronin" by the youngster. After an initial attempt to control the robot failed and went on an accidental rampage, Rob succeeded in piloting Red Ronin into battle with Godzilla in an attempt to drive the beast off. Rob wished to prevent the radioactive creature from being harmed and Red Ronin's attempts to ward Godzilla off of the San Diego missile base were designed to actually preserve the monster's life. Rob succeeded in doing so and it was discovered that Red Ronin had been imprinted with Rob's brain patterns, making the robot useless without Rob to pilot. Red Ronin refused to respond to James Woo's brain patterns once imprinted with Rob's. Rob was ordered to stay away from the robot but stole aboard Red Ronin again and confronted Godzilla and the giant Bigfoot Yetrigar in the Grand Canyon, causing a landslide that buried Yetrigar. Alongside Godzilla, he then battled the alien Mega-Monsters (Triax, Rhiahn and Krollar) outside Salt Lake City, Utah. During the battle, Rhiahn decapitated Red Ronin, leaving Godzilla to finish the fight alone. Rob survived but the robot was left inactive.

S.H.I.E.L.D. eventually rebuilt the robot with Stark International's technicians' aid. The technician Earl Cowan altered the robot so it would only respond to his brain patterns, similarly to how it had previously been linked to Rob's. Cowan intended to use Red Ronin to orchestrate a series of events that would set off World War III with the Soviet Union. Cowan was completely ignorant of the shortest aerial route to the U.S.S.R. and went eastward instead of going northward and passed over New York City. This allowed the Avengers to intercept and defeat Red Ronin rampaging in New York harbor. The robot was torn to scrap in the melee and its remains were carried off by S.H.I.E.L.D.

Stane International eventually gained possession of the remains. The scientist Karaguchi Inoyawa rebuilt the robot, hoping to use as a force for good. The robot was displayed by Stane International at a trade show at the Pontiac Silverdome. While there Red Ronin was commandeered by vengeful ex-employee Joe Kilman who caused Red Ronin to go on a rampage. This time, Inoyawa guided the Wasp in deactivating Red Ronin.

Red Ronin eventually wound up in Fujikawa Electronics' hands. It was altered to look even more like a samurai in appearance. Numerous military and criminal organizations (such as the Hand) attempted to gain possession of the mechanoid, but were foiled by Wolverine and Sunfire.

Red Ronin next appeared restored to its original form and used by Henry Peter Gyrich to lure the Avengers into a battle with the Thunderbolts.

Red Ronin has since 'joined' the Thunderbolts during the Civil War series. This version has the Fixer is likely all over this, though Red Ronin was never seen in any battles during the event. Some time prior to this, it also clashed with the Inhumans in a battle not clearly remembered due to the Sentry's unwittingly mind-altering powers.

A version of the classic model appears when Zodiac hijacks the mech to unleash on New York as part of a plan to discredit Norman Osborn as the director of H.A.M.M.E.R.

Namie
The limited series Loners introduced readers to a character known only as Namie, since she was amnesiac after breaking out of a facility producing Mutant Growth Hormone. Julie Power looks after her while the other members of the group try to figure out what to do with her, but before anything can be decided, they are brought into a fight with Phil Urich who went insane and stole the Darkhawk armor. Namie helps to bring Urich down, but after he spills the beans on a deal made between Turbo and Fuyumi Fujikawa that would have sold out the team, he struck a new deal with her where Urich and Hollow would return to Fujikawa, while the Loners kept Namie who he then reveals to be the new Red Ronin cyborg.

Powers and abilities
Red Ronin is controlled by a human operator who wears a "cybernetic helmet" and sits within its head.

Red Ronin possesses immense strength and speed, is highly durable and can fly at subsonic speed using the atomic propulsion units in its legs. It is armed with a pulsating "rotary discus" shield on its right arm that has a solar-powered laser-blade sword and which doubles as an ultraviolet laser Gatling gun device. Red Ronin also has a magnetic field generator in its shoulder epaulets and arm-mounted power blasters that are capable of firing blasts of concussive force equivalent to 100 tons of TNT. Additionally, the shield is also capable of firing missiles, which Red Ronin used during its battle against Yetrigar in the Grand Canyon, and can be used as a detachable thrown weapon, containing a homing device that enables it to return to the robot. Red Ronin's left hand also has the ability to convert to an energy cannon that projects energy blasts. In addition, it could release "magne-clamp cables" from its boot units, which were strong enough to hold and support a being as massive as Godzilla. Red Ronin later gained the ability to automatically repair its circuitry and to detach its hands from its body and retain control of them while detached.

Namie is actually reduced to the size and appearance of a young Asian woman with red and black hair. Her main weapons are red energy blades that extend from her wrists. She has also demonstrated some advanced fighting techniques as well.

Other versions
A version of Red Ronin appeared on an Earth visited by the dimension-hopping heroes known as the Exiles (Earth-3752). On Earth-3752, Red Ronin was the chief weapon of the Science Squad, a group of monster hunters and was invented by Bolivar Trask. This version was destroyed by its reality's version of Fin Fang Foom.

Red Ronin also appeared in the Mega Morphs miniseries, reprogrammed by Doctor Doom had Doctor Octopus so that Doctor Doom could control remotely. After easily taking down the Mega Morphs of Captain America, Spider-Man, Wolverine and the Ghost Rider, Red Ronin was defeated by the Hulk whom Doctor Doom had previously taken over to assist in the prison break of Doctor Octopus.

In Earth-X's universe, Red Ronin was decommissioned and given to Tony Stark by President Norman Osborn. The robot's designs were eventually as the base for a towering Iron Man armor.

References

External links

Characters created by Doug Moench
Characters created by Herb Trimpe
Comics characters introduced in 1978
Marvel Comics characters with superhuman strength
Marvel Comics robots
Mecha comics
S.H.I.E.L.D.